Thurrock Borough Council, usually known as simply Thurrock Council, is the local authority for the borough of Thurrock in Essex, England. Since 1997, Thurrock has been a unitary authority, combining the functions of a non-metropolitan county with that of a non-metropolitan district. The other such authority in Essex is Southend-on-Sea. It is a member of the East of England Local Government Association. Essex County Council have taken over Thurrock's finances after failed investments by Thurrock.

History

Poor law union and urban district 
In 1835, as a result of the Poor Law Amendment Act 1834, the parishes that make up the modern borough of Thurrock were united under the Orsett Union, a poor law union. The union was established on 31 October 1935. It was governed by a board of guardians made up of 21 elected representatives, each representing a parish. Most parishes elected one representative, though Grays Thurrock elected two and Orsett elected three. The 18 parishes in the union included Aveley, Bulphan, Chadwell St Mary, Corringham, Fobbing, Hordon-on-the-Hill, Langdon Hills, Mucking, North and South Ockendon, Orsett, Stanford-le-Hope, Stifford, Grays Thurrock, Little Thurrock, West Thurrock, and East and West Tilbury.

Between 1837 and 1880, the parish of Canvey Island was also part of the union. The area the union administered was also called the Orsett Hundred in reference to the hundreds of Chafford and Barstable, which covered the area.

Local government in the Orsett Union was further split between Grays Thurrock Urban District Council (established in 1886), Orsett Rural District Council (established ), Tilbury Town Council (established in 1912) and Purfleet Urban District Council (established in 1929).

In 1936, as a result of the Local Government Act 1929, the four councils amalgamated as Thurrock Urban District Council. Thurrock Urban District was a local government area and a civil parish, and it was formed from the Orsett Union and its parishes, which were subsequently abolished. From 1938, the district also included the part of the former Little Burstead parish which was located in Basildon New Town, which had been transferred from the Billericay Urban District.

District and Borough Council 
Local government in Essex was reorganised in 1974 with services being transferred to Essex County Council. Thurrock Urban District and its council were abolished. The urban district was replaced by Thurrock District, which was created on 1 April 1974. Thurrock District Council was first elected in 1973, a year before formally coming into its powers and prior to the creation of the district.

The council received borough status, permitting the council to be known as Thurrock Borough Council. Until 1998 it was constituted as non-metropolitan district council in a two-tier arrangement, sharing service provision with Essex County Council.

As a result of the 1992 Local Government Commission for England, on 1 April 1998 Thurrock absorbed the powers of Essex County Council for its area, becoming a unitary authority. The planning function for large developments was exercised by the Thurrock Thames Gateway Development Corporation in the whole of the borough from 2003 to 2012. The development corporation was absorbed by the council on 1 April 2012.

Solar energy and other investments
In 2020, it emerged that the council had borrowed £420 million to buy into the solar power market, eventually rising to a total investment of £655m. The prudence of Thurrock's strategy has been questioned. The company (Toucan Energy Holdings 1) entered administration on 11 November 2022. There was also a £94 million loan to the Just Loans Group plc, a business lender, which went bankrupt in June 2022.

On 2 September 2022, the Secretary of State for Levelling Up, Housing and Communities intervened in the running of Thurrock Council, passing financial control of the council to Essex County Council, as well as ordering a Best Value Inspection, in response to concerns about the council's level of financial risk and debt. The council's financial exposure arises from loans of more than a billion pounds used to fund commercial investments. Council leader Rob Gledhill resigned on 2 September.

On 29 November 2022, Thurrock council admitted that in the current financial year it had a near £500 million budget deficit, mostly from failed investments. It asked for emergency financial assistance from the government. The council issued a Section 114 notice barring any new expenditure on 19 December 2022.

Election results and council control

For most of the council's history, it has been controlled by Labour, including from 1982 to 2004 and again from 2010 to 2015. In 2016, the council became under no overall control, but with a Conservative leader, Rob Gledhill. By the 2021 Thurrock Council election Conservatives had regained control.

Historic political control is shown alongside the historic election results.

Composition
Thurrock is divided into 20 wards and elects 49 councillors. One-third of the council is elected every year on a four-year term and so every fourth year there is no election. Councillors are elected through first-past-the-post voting. There are 19 committees, including:

 Cabinet
 Corporate parenting
 General services
 Health and wellbeing board
 Licensing
 Planning
 Standards and audit
 Corporate Scrutiny
 Cleaner, Greener and Safer Scrutiny
 Children's Services Scrutiny
 Health and Wellbeing Scrutiny
 Housing Scrutiny

Electoral wards
The borough's 20 electoral wards and corresponding representatives are:

Mayors and leaders

Thurrock Council has a leader, mayor and chief executive. The leader of the council is also typically the leader of its largest party. They are scrutinised by the leader of the opposition, who typically leads the council's largest non-governing party.

Until 2 September 2022, when he resigned, Conservative councillor Rob Gledhill was Council leader who was in office since 2016, while the current leader of the opposition is Labour Group leader John Kent. Kent was previously the leader of the council from 2010 to 2016, when he stood down after his party's loss in the 2016 council election. He remained leader of the Labour Group until his parliamentary candidacy in the 2017 general election, returning after his successor Oliver Gerrish's resignation in August 2018. He left his post after again standing for election to parliament in 2019 but returned after his successor Jane Pothecary resigned from the leadership in 2020. From 2016 to 2018, the leader of the opposition was UKIP Group and then Thurrock Independent Group leader Graham Snell, who was de-seated and lost the opposition leadership to Labour's Oliver Gerrish after the 2018 council election.

The mayor acts as the council's chairman and undertakes ceremonial duties. They usually serve for a one-year term, with a new mayor being elected by councillors in an annual council session. Although rare, mayors have served for a longer period, such as when Mayor Yash Gupta served from 2011 to 2013. The current mayor is Conservative councillor James Halden, who is the first homosexual to serve in this position. He was sworn in on 26 May 2022. The first mayor in Thurrock was Margaret Jones who served from 1974 and the first Black mayor was Tunde Ojetola who served from 2017 to 2018.

Historic leaders and mayors are recorded with the historic election results.

Arms

See also
Thurrock, the area with borough status which this council administers.

References

Unitary authority councils of England
Politics of Thurrock
Local authorities in Essex
Local education authorities in England
Billing authorities in England
Leader and cabinet executives